Tom Almadon (born November 30, 1984) is an American-Israeli footballer.

He plays for Maccabi Ahi Nazareth and was the goalkeeper for the Israel national under-21 football team. A product of Maccabi Haifa youth department, he has been reserve goalkeeper (covering Nir Davidovich) for the senior team for the past three years and appeared once in the UEFA Champions League. He was loaned to Hapoel Nazareth Illit for the 2007–08 season.

Honours
Israeli Premier League (1):
2004–05
Toto Cup (1):
2005-06

References

External links

1984 births
Living people
Israeli Jews
Israeli footballers
Maccabi Haifa F.C. players
Hapoel Nof HaGalil F.C. players
Maccabi Ahi Nazareth F.C. players
Hakoah Maccabi Amidar Ramat Gan F.C. players
Bnei Yehuda Tel Aviv F.C. players
Hapoel Tel Aviv F.C. players
Hapoel Rishon LeZion F.C. players
F.C. Tzeirei Kafr Kanna players
Maccabi Tzur Shalom F.C. players
Hapoel Acre F.C. players
Maccabi Ironi Tamra F.C. players
Israeli Premier League players
Liga Leumit players
Israel under-21 international footballers
American emigrants to Israel
Association football goalkeepers